Henry Bernier (July 6, 1821 in St. Louis de Lotbinière, Lower Canada – November 9, 1893) was a Canadian politician, businessman and manufacturer.

The son of Jean-Baptiste Bernier and Margaret Bélanger, Bernier was educated locally. He married Henrietta Paré. Bernier was principal partner in H. Bernier and Company, which operated a foundry and produced agricultural implements. He was president of the Deschambault and Lotbinière Steamboar Company. He was elected to the House of Commons of Canada in the 1874 election as a Member of the Liberal Party to represent the riding of Lotbinière.

References

External links
 

1821 births
1893 deaths
Liberal Party of Canada MPs
Members of the House of Commons of Canada from Quebec